Percy Bolt (1885–1953) was an Australian pioneer rugby league footballer who played in the 1910s.

Playing career
Bolt was a rugby union convert who joined Western Suburbs in 1910 and captained the club that year. He joined the stronger Annandale club in 1911 but he retired by year's end.

Death
Bolt died at his Stanmore home on 14 October 1953, aged 68.

References

1885 births
1953 deaths
Annandale rugby league players
Australian rugby league players
Date of birth missing
Rugby league players from Sydney
Rugby league five-eighths
Western Suburbs Magpies captains
Western Suburbs Magpies players